This is a list of all British formations raised to serve in the Second Boer War

Corps

Divisions

Footnotes

Citations

References

Second Boer War
British Army